Compulsive buying disorder (CBD), or oniomania (from Greek   'for sale' and   'insanity'), is characterized by an obsession with shopping and buying behavior that causes adverse consequences. It "is experienced as an irresistible–uncontrollable urge, resulting in excessive, expensive and time-consuming retail activity [that is] typically prompted by negative affectivity" and results in "gross social, personal and/or financial difficulties". Most people with CBD meet the criteria for a personality disorder. Compulsive buying can also be found among people with  Parkinson's disease or frontotemporal dementia.

Compulsive buying-shopping disorder is classified by ICD-11  among "other specified impulse control disorders". Several authors have considered compulsive shopping rather as a variety of dependence disorder.

History
According to German physician Max Nordau, French psychiatrist Valentin Magnan coined the term oniomania in the 1892 German translation of his Psychiatric Lectures. Magnan describes compulsive buying as a symptom of social degeneration. In his book Degeneration (1892), Nordau calls oniomania or "buying craze" a "stigma of degeneration". Emil Kraepelin described oniomania as of 1909, and he and Bleuler both included the syndrome in their influential early psychiatric textbooks. Kraepelin described oniomania as "a pathological desire to buy... without any actual need and in great quantities", considering it alongside kleptomania and other conditions that were thought to be related to impulsivity (of the type nowadays denoted impulse control disorders).

Relatively little interest seems to have been taken in collocating CBD as a distinct pathology until the 1990s. It has been suggested that even in the 21st century, compulsive shopping can be considered a barely recognised mental illness. Since 2019, ICD-11 (the 11th revision of the International Classification of Diseases) has classified it among "other specified impulse control disorders" (coded as ), using the descriptor compulsive buying-shopping disorder.

Characteristics
CBD is characterized by an obsession with shopping and buying behavior that causes adverse consequences. According to Kellett and Bolton, it "is experienced as an irresistible–uncontrollable urge, resulting in excessive, expensive and time-consuming retail activity [that is] typically prompted by negative affectivity" and results in "gross social, personal and/or financial difficulties". What differentiates CBD from healthy shopping is the compulsive, destructive and chronic nature of the buying. Where shopping can be a positive route to self-expression, in excess it represents a dangerous threat. 

CBD is frequently comorbid with mood, anxiety, substance abuse and eating disorders. People who score highly on compulsive-buying scales tend to understand their feelings poorly and have low tolerance for unpleasant psychological states such as negative moods. The onset of CBD occurs in the late teens and early twenties and is generally chronic. The phenomenon of compulsive buying tends to affect women rather than men. The aforementioned reports on this matter indicated that the dominance of the majority group is so great that it accounts for about more than 90% of the affected demographic. Zadka and Olajossy suggest the presence of several similar tendencies between consumer-type mannerisms and pathologic consumption of psychoactive elements. These tendencies include a constant need to consume, personal dependence, and a tendency to lack a sense of self-control over behavior. Additionally, Zadka and Olajossy state that one could conclude that individuals suffering from the disorder are often in the second decade to fourth decade of their lives and exhibit mannerisms akin to neurotic personality and impulse-control disorders.

CBD is similar to, but distinguished from, OCD hoarding and mania. Compulsive buying is not limited to people who spend beyond their means; it also includes people who spend an inordinate amount of time shopping or who chronically think about buying things but never purchase them. Promising treatments for CBD include medication such as selective serotonin reuptake inhibitors (SSRIs), and support groups such as Debtors Anonymous.

Research reveals that 1.8 to 8.1 percent of the general adult population have CBD and that while the usual onset is late adolescence or early adulthood, it is often recognized as a problem later in life.

Distinctions

Compulsive buying disorder is tightly associated with excessive or poorly managed urges related to the purchase of the items and spending of currency in any form; digital, mobile, credit or cash.

Four phases have been identified in compulsive buying: anticipation, preparation, shopping, and spending. The first phase involves a preoccupation with purchasing a specific item or with shopping in general. The second phase the individual plans the shopping excursion. The third phase is the actual shopping event; while the fourth phase is completed by the feelings of excitement connected to spending money on their desired items.

The terms compulsive shopping, compulsive buying, and compulsive spending are often used interchangeably, but the behaviors they represent are in fact distinct. One may buy without shopping, and certainly shop without buying: of compulsive shoppers, some 30 percent described the act of buying itself as providing a buzz, irrespective of the goods purchased.

Causes
Compulsive buying can be found among people with  Parkinson's disease or frontotemporal dementia.

CBD often has roots in early experience. Perfectionism, general impulsiveness and compulsiveness, dishonesty, insecurity, and the need to gain control have also been linked to the disorder. From a medical perspective, it can be concluded that impulse-control disorders are attributed to the desire for positive stimuli. The normal method of operation in a healthy brain is that the frontal cortex regulation handles the activity of reward. However, in individuals with behavioral disorders, this particular system malfunctions. Scientists have reported that compulsive buyers have significantly different activity in this area of the brain.

Compulsive buying seems to represent a search for self in people whose identity is neither firmly felt nor dependable, as indicated by the way purchases often provide social or personal identity-markers.  Those with associated disorders such as PTSD/CPTSD, anxiety, depression and poor impulse control are particularly likely to attempt to treat symptoms of low self-esteem through compulsive shopping.

Others, however, object, stating that such psychological explanations for compulsive buying do not apply to all people with CBD.

Social conditions also play an important role in CBD, the rise of consumer culture contributing to the view of compulsive buying as a specifically postmodern addiction, particularly with regard to internet buying platforms.

Readily available credit cards enable casual spending beyond one's means, and some would suggest that the compulsive buyer should lock up or destroy credit cards altogether. Online shopping also facilitates CBD, with online auction addiction, used to escape feelings of depression or guilt, becoming a recognizable problem.

Materialism and image-seeking

A social psychological perspective suggests that compulsive buying may be seen as an exaggerated form of a more normal search for validation through purchasing. Also, pressures from the spread of materialist values and consumer culture over the recent decades can drive people into compulsive shopping.

Companies have adopted aggressive neuromarketing by associating the identification of a high social status with the purchasing of items. They strive to bring out such an individual as a sort of folk hero for having the ability to buy several items. As a result, according to Zadka and Olajossy, the act of shopping is then associated with the feeling of holding a higher social status or of climbing the social ranks. Zadka holds that these companies take advantage of the frailties of peoples' egos in an attempt to get them to spend their money.

Symptoms and course

Diagnostic criteria for compulsive buying have been proposed:

 Over-preoccupation with buying. 
 Distress or impairment as a result of the activity. 
 Compulsive buying is not limited to hypomanic or manic episodes.
 Constant obsessing with buying as well as being dissatisfied all the time.

While initially triggered by a perhaps mild need to feel special, the failure of compulsive shopping to actually meet such needs may lead to a vicious cycle of escalation, with them experiencing the highs and lows associated with other addictions. The 'high' of the purchasing may be followed by a sense of disappointment, and of guilt, precipitating a further cycle of impulse buying. With the now addicted person increasingly feeling negative emotions like anger and stress, they may attempt to self-medicate through further purchases, followed again by regret or depression once they return home, leading to an urge for buying more. The aforementioned symptoms are aggravated further by the availability of money through access to credit cards and easy bank loans.

As debt grows, the compulsive shopping may become a more secretive act. At the point where bought goods are hidden or destroyed, because the person concerned feels so ashamed of their addiction, the price of the addiction in mental, financial and emotional terms becomes even higher.

Individuals who can be considered addicted to shopping are observed to exhibit repetitive and obsessive urges to go buy items, especially when in the vicinity of an environment that supports this venture, such as a mall. In such locations, they mostly purchase things that are cheap and of low value mainly just to satisfy the urge to spend. Normally, these items end up being returned to the shop or disposed of entirely after a while. However, according to Zadka and Olajossy, this rarely works as these individuals are known to have low self-esteem.

Consequences

The consequences of compulsive buying, which may persist long after a spree, can be devastating, with marriages, long-term relationships, and jobs all feeling the strain. Further problems can include ruined credit history, theft or defalcation of money, defaulted loans, general financial trouble and in some cases bankruptcy or extreme debt, as well as anxiety and a sense of life spiraling out of control.  The resulting stress can lead to physical health problems and ruined relationships, or even suicide.

Treatment
Treatment involves becoming conscious of the addiction through studying, therapy and group work. Research done by Michel Lejoyeux and Aviv Weinstein suggests that the best possible treatment for CBD is cognitive behavioral therapy. They suggest that a patient first be "evaluated for psychiatric comorbidity, especially with depression, so that appropriate pharmacological treatment can be instituted." Their research indicates that patients who received cognitive behavioral therapy over 10 weeks had reduced episodes of compulsive buying and spent less time shopping as opposed to patients who did not receive this treatment (251).

Lejoyeux and Weinstein also write about pharmacological treatment and studies that question the use of drugs on CBD. They declare "few controlled studies have assessed the effects of pharmacological treatment on compulsive buying, and none have shown any medication to be effective." (252) The most effective treatment is to attend therapy and group work in order to prevent continuation of this addiction.

Hague et al. reports that group therapy rendered the highest results as far as treatment of compulsive buying disorder is concerned. He states that group therapy contributed to about 72.8% in positive change in the reduction of urges of compulsive spending. Additionally, he notes that psychotherapy may not be the treatment of choice for all compulsive buying disorder patients since the suitability of the treatment method to the patient is also an important consideration. He holds that the treatments of the disorder are required to provide a certain reflection of the context in which this phenomenon manifests.

Selective serotonin reuptake inhibitors such as fluvoxamine and citalopram may be useful in the treatment of CBD, although current evidence is mixed. Opioid antagonists such as naltrexone and nalmefene are promising potential treatments for CBD. A review concluded that evidence is limited and insufficient to support their use at present, however. Naltrexone and nalmefene have also shown effectiveness in the treatment of gambling addiction, an associated disorder.

Historical examples
Mary Todd Lincoln (1818–1882), wife of US president Abraham Lincoln, was addicted to shopping, running up (and concealing) large bills on credit, feeling manic glee at spending sprees, followed by depressive reactions in the face of the results.

See also 
 Shopping addiction
 Money disorders
 Shopaholic (novels)
 Confessions of a Shopaholic (film)

References

Further reading
Benson, A. To Buy or Not to Buy: Why We Overshop and How to Stop  Boston: Trumpeter Books, 2008.

Bleuler, E.  Textbook of Psychiatry.  New York: Macmillan, 1924.
Catalano E. and Sonenberg, N. Consuming Passions: Help for Compulsive Shoppers.  Oakland: New Harbinger Publications, 1993.

Kraepelin, E.  Psychiatrie (8th ed.).  Leipzig: Verlag von Johann Ambrosius Barth, 1915.
McElroy, SL, Phillips KA, Keck PE, Jr. 1994 "Obsessive Compulsive Spectrum Disorder."  Journal of Clinical Psychiatry 55(10, suppl): 33-51

External links
 What is Compulsive Shopping Disorder?
 Shopping addiction

Debt
Personal finance
Behavioral addiction